Rolph Eric van der Hoeven  (born 23 June 1948) is emeritus professor on employment and development economics at the International Institute of Social Studies in The Hague and was appointed in 2009 as a member of the Committee on Development Cooperation of the International Advisory Council (AIV) to the Dutch Government. Dr. van der Hoeven is a member of the Board of Trustees of the KNCV Tuberculosis Fund.

Education 
Dr. van der Hoeven read econometrics at the University of Amsterdam where in 1969 he earned himself a BSc and followed it up with a MSc (Drs.) in 1974. He was awarded a PhD in development economics in 1987 when he defended his thesis Planning for Basic Needs in Kenya: A Basic Needs Simulation Model at the Free University of Amsterdam.

Career 
Dr. van der Hoeven has worked for over 30 years in various places in the world for UNICEF and International Labour Organization (ILO), where he was most recently manager of the Technical Secretariat of the World Commission on the Social Dimension of Globalization, established by the International Labour Organization in Geneva. Having previously held positions in the Employment Strategy Department of the ILO and with UNICEF in New York, he is widely published on employment, poverty, inequality, and economic reform issues.

At the beginning of his career, he worked in Zambia and Ethiopia, highlighted the necessity for developing countries to emphasize the satisfaction of Basic Needs as a prime goal in Development Planning, and advised various countries (Zambia, Swasiland, Tanzania, Niger, Sierra Leone) on how to implement the Basic Needs approach.

In the 1980s following the introduction of structural adjustment programs by the World bank and the IMF, Dr. van der Hoeven researched and advocated that employment and other social concerns should be taken into account in structural adjustment programs. He played a key role in the high-level meeting on structural adjustment and employment of the ILO in 1987 and joined in 1988 the team in UNICEF, under the leadership of Sir Richard Jolly that worked on Adjustment with a Human Face.

In the early 1990s he returned to the ILO to manage the Interdepartmental Project on Structural Adjustment in the ILO.

Since 2000 he warns of the globalization effects on income inequality and employment, and became in 2002 the manager of the technical secretariat of the World Commission on the Social Dimension of Globalization.

Dr. van der Hoeven has focused primarily on the functional inequality of income distribution between labor and capital, i.e. the share of gross domestic product received by workers and capital owners.

Dr. van der Hoeven appeals to politicians to use the power of macroeconomic policies to reduce inequality. He suggested a number of political solutions including counter-cyclical monetary and fiscal policy, stricter financial and bank regulation, progressive tax systems and strengthening social institutions like labor unions. These kinds of policies have led to a notable decline in inequality in Latin America. In light of this, Dr. van der Hoeven called for an inequality goal based on the Palma index of inequality to be included in the post-2015 development agenda (SDGs).

Decorations 
 Order of Orange-Nassau
  Officer (8 October 2015)

Publications

Articles 
Profits without labour benefits, The impact of financial globalization on work (2014)
Millennium Development Goals in Turbulent Times: Emerging Challenges for POST-2015 MDGS
 with J vandemoortele Kenya – Stabilisation and Adjustment Policies and Programmes (Helsinki, WIDER, 1987).

Books 
Authored
 
 
 
 
 
 
Editor
Sustainable Development Goals and Income Inequality (Abingdon, Edward Elgar, 2017) (editor with P. van Bergeijk)
The Financial Crisis and Developing Countries . A Global Multilateral Perspective (Abingdon, Edward Elgar, 2011) (editor with P. van Bergeijk and A.de Haan)
Employment, Inequality and Globalization : A continuous Concern (London, Routledge, 2011) (editor)
Growth, Inequality and Poverty (Oxford, Oxford University Press, 2004) (editor with Anthony Shorrocks).
Adjustment, Employment and Missing Institutions in sub-Saharan Africa (ILO, James Currey 1999) (editor with W. van der Geest).
Lessons from Privatization. Labour Issues in Developing and Transition Countries (ILO, 1997) (editor with G. Sziraczki).
The Poverty Agenda: Trends and Policy Options (International Institute for Labour Studies, 1995) (editor with G. Rodgers).
Structural Adjustment and Beyond (London, James Currey, 1994) (editor with F. van der Kraaij).
Africa's Recovery in the 1990s: From Stagnation and Adjustment to Human Development: Policy Conflicts and Alternatives (London, Macmillan, 1992) (editor with A. Cornia and T. Mkandawire).

References

External links 
 
 Personal profile: prof.dr. Rolph van der Hoeven  International Institute of Social Studies in The Hague
 Personal profile: prof.dr. Rolph van der Hoeven Erasmus University Rotterdam

1948 births
Living people
Dutch development economists
Dutch expatriates in Switzerland
Academic staff of Erasmus University Rotterdam
Officers of the Order of Orange-Nassau
University of Amsterdam alumni
Vrije Universiteit Amsterdam alumni